Pizza Thief is a pizzeria in Portland, Oregon. The restaurant has a "sibling" adjacent bar called Bandit Bar.

Description 

Pizza Thief is a pizzeria in northwest Portland's Northwest District. The restaurant serves pizza, sometimes described as New York-style pizza. Pizza Thief's chef and co-owner has disputed the description and said, "People have been describing us as New York style. New York is big floppy pizza. Us having a slice shop is part of that. But I don't see New York making naturally leavened pizza crust.”

The restaurant has been described as "an open space, brightly painted to create a vibrant atmosphere". Willamette Week's Campy Draper said Pizza Thief is "bright and family-friendly with big windows, a pair of arcade cabinets, and tall walls covered with simple, colorful illustrations of flowers and raccoons. The service is walk-up, but should you bring the kiddos, you can easily keep them in sight." Gluten-free pizzas are available.

Adjacent to the pizzeria is Bandit Bar, operated by the same owners within the same building.

History 
Chef and co-owner Darby Aldaco opened Pizza Thief with partner Tony Pasquale in May–June 2021.

Reception 

Karen Brooks of Portland Monthly wrote, "You could mistake this for a New York pie, but don't. The crust is unmistakably Portland, tasting more like delicious sourdough bread than pizza crust—rugged and chewy, alive, tinged with local rye and spelt." She included the restaurant in a list of the city's best restaurants of 2021, and said Pizza Thief was one of three "newcomers [that] bolster the case that Portland is America's best pizza city". In 2021, Brooke Jackson-Glidden included the pizzeria in Eater Portland's overview of "Where to Find Exceptional Pizzas in Portland", and wrote: "Pizza Thief still stands out for its take on a New York-style pizza, which retains the unfussy joy of a pepperoni slice with the signature tang of a sourdough pie. The shop's pepperoni has a nice char-dotted base with a serious dose of stretchy cheese, and the Hot Tony is absolutely piled with cured meats and peppers."

See also

 Pizza in Portland, Oregon

References

External links 

 

2021 establishments in Oregon
Northwest District, Portland, Oregon
Pizzerias in Portland, Oregon
Restaurants established in 2021